City Market is a supermarket brand of Kroger in the Rocky Mountains of the United States. City Market, Inc. has its headquarters in Grand Junction, Colorado.

City Market was founded by the Prinster family in 1924, when four brothers—Paul, Frank, Leo and Clarence—moved to Grand Junction from La Junta, Colorado. Tony Prinster's father, Frank Prinster Jr., was also president of the City Market, serving from 1961 to 1978. Joseph C. Prinster was president from 1978 to 1987, and Leo T. Prinster served as president from 1987 to 1990. Tony Prinster was president from 1990 until 2001. He joined the company in 1987 after practicing law.

Phillis Norris took the presidency February 4, 2001, and was the first non-member of the Prinster family to do so. She began her City Market career in 1974 as a store checker. She moved through the ranks of store management, eventually becoming vice president of retail operations in 1994, a position she held for five years.

In 1969, the company was acquired by the Dillon Companies. City Market became part of The Kroger Co. when Dillon and Kroger merged in 1983. City Market currently operates 38 stores in western and central Colorado, Utah, and Wyoming.
It formerly operated a location in New Mexico, but it shuttered.

References

External links 

City Market homepage
Kroger corporate homepage

Kroger
Supermarkets of the United States
Companies based in Grand Junction, Colorado
Retail companies established in 1924
American companies established in 1924
Food and drink companies established in 1924
1924 establishments in Colorado
Economy of the Southwestern United States